Ingesson is a Scandinavian surname. Notable people with the surname include:

 Klas Ingesson (1968–2014), Swedish footballer and manager
 Magnus Ingesson (born 1971), Swedish cross country skier

Swedish-language surnames